The Warrimoo Horse Trough is a Bills horse trough in Warrimoo, Australia and is a historical icon to the town. It is a simple stone drinking trough originally designed to provide drinking water to horses. It is currently located in Ardill Park outside the Community Hall.

History

The Horse Trough is one of about 700 troughs that were erected between 1930 and 1940 across Australia by the Metropolitan Drinking Fountain and Cattle Troughs Association after the passing of George Bills who had previously donated to the association. One of these troughs were installed in several locations across the Blue Mountains including Warrimoo, Wentworth Falls and Medlow Bath.

References

History of the Blue Mountains (New South Wales)